Cameron McGlenn (February 16, 1988 – May 6, 2020) was an American arena football defensive back. He played college football for Elon.

Early life
McGlenn attended South Point High School in Belmont, North Carolina. While at South Point, McGlenn was a member of the football and track and field teams.

Professional career

Iowa Barnstormers
After going undrafted. McGlenn was assigned to the Iowa Barnstormers of the Arena Football League. McGlenn played two seasons for the Barnstormers, leading the team in tackles both season.

Charlotte Speed
McGlenn was announced as a signee of the Charlotte Speed, who intended to play in the Professional Indoor Football League, but the team never made it to the field, folding before the season began.

Spokane Shock
McGlenn was assigned to the Spokane Shock for the 2013 season. McGlenn was reassigned 10 weeks into the season.

New Orleans VooDoo
After his release, McGlenn was assigned to the New Orleans VooDoo. In his first game with the VooDoo, McGlenn had two interceptions.

Tampa Bay Storm
On October 16, 2015, McGlenn was assigned to the Tampa Bay Storm.

Guangzhou Power
McGlenn played for the Guangzhou Power of the China Arena Football League (CAFL) in 2016 and earned All-Pro South Division All-Star honors.

Washington Valor
McGlenn was assigned to the Washington Valor on January 9, 2017.

Death
At 3:48 a.m. on May 6, 2020, after McGlenn's vehicle ran out of gas, he attempted to cross Interstate 485 on foot and was struck by an oncoming vehicle, killing him instantly.

References

External links
Elon College bio 

1988 births
2020 deaths
American football defensive backs
Elon Phoenix football players
Iowa Barnstormers players
Spokane Shock players
New Orleans VooDoo players
Tampa Bay Storm players
Washington Valor players
Guangzhou Power  players
Players of American football from North Carolina
People from Belmont, North Carolina
Road incident deaths in North Carolina
Pedestrian road incident deaths